Alda Leif Jónsdóttir (born 18 April 1979) is an Icelandic former basketball player. She has won the Icelandic championship four times and the Dutch championship once. Alda was a seven-time selection for the Úrvalsdeild Domestic All-First Team and was named the Úrvalsdeild Domestic Player of the Year in 2002.

Club career
During the 1999–2000 season, Alda led the Úrvalsdeild in assists, blocks, steals, shooting percent and free throw percent. She spent the following season with Holbæk in the Dameligaen, averaging 11 points, 6 rebounds, 4 assists and 3,5 steals per game.

In 2005, Alda signed with BV Den Helder (women) of the Dutch Women's Basketball League (WBL). She was named to the 2006 Dutch All-Star game and helped Den Helder to the Dutch championship.

After missing the most of the 2013–14 season due to surgery on both knees, Alda helped Snæfell win the national championship for the first time in 2014. She helped the team to the championship again in 2015 and 2016.

National team career
Between 1996 and 2005, Alda played 52 games for the Icelandic national basketball team.

Team of the 20th century
In 2001 Alda was voted as one of the twelve players on the Icelandic team of the 20th century.

Personal life
Alda is the daughter of Kolbrún Leifsdóttir who was named one of the top 12 Icelandic basketball players of the 20th century.

Awards, titles and accomplishments

Individual awards

Iceland
Icelandic Team of the 20th century
Úrvalsdeild Domestic Player of the Year: 2002
Úrvalsdeild Domestic All-First Team (7): 1997–2000, 2002, 2004, 2005

Titles

Holland
Dutch champion: 2006

Iceland
Úrvalsdeild (4): 2000, 2014, 2015, 2016
Icelandic Basketball Cup (3): 2000, 2003, 2016
Icelandic Super Cup: 2012
Icelandic Company Cup (2): 1998, 2012
1. deild kvenna: 2008

Accomplishments

Holland
Dutch All-Star game: 2006

Iceland
Icelandic All-Star game: 2005, 2013
Úrvalsdeild scoring champion: 2002
Úrvalsdeild assists leader (5): 1998, 1999, 2000, 2002, 2004
Úrvalsdeild blocks leader (5): 1999, 2000, 2002, 2003, 2004
Úrvalsdeild steals leader: 2000

References

External links
Icelandic statistics 2010-present at Icelandic Basketball Association
Eurobasket Profile
FIBA Europe profile

1979 births
Living people
BV Den Helder players
Dameligaen players
Alda Leif Jonsdottir
Alda Leif Jonsdottir
Alda Leif Jonsdottir
Alda Leif Jonsdottir
Alda Leif Jonsdottir
Shooting guards
Alda Leif Jonsdottir
Alda Leif Jonsdottir
Alda Leif Jonsdottir